Anthony David Pickrell (3 November 1942 — October 2015) was a Welsh professional footballer who played as a winger. He made 18 appearances in the Football League for Cardiff City.

Career
Born in Neath, Pickrell signed for Cardiff City in 1960. The following season, he broke into the first team, making eighteen league appearances and scoring four times. However, he contracted a serious chest illness that forced him to retire from football.

References

1942 births
2015 deaths
Welsh footballers
Footballers from Neath
Cardiff City F.C. players
English Football League players
Association football wingers